The rufous-throated flycatcher (Ficedula rufigula) is a species of bird in the family Muscicapidae. It is endemic to Sulawesi, Indonesia. Its natural habitat is subtropical or tropical moist lowland forests. It is threatened by habitat loss.

References

rufous-throated flycatcher
Endemic birds of Sulawesi
rufous-throated flycatcher
Taxonomy articles created by Polbot